Wyoming Highway 315 (WYO 315) is a  state highway in the southeastern part of Platte County, Wyoming, named Pioneer Road, located just east of Slater, Wyoming.

Route description 
Wyoming Highway 315 begins its south end at Wyoming Highway 314 (Slater Road) and travels north  to its north end at Platte CR 232 (Bordeaux Road).

Major intersections

References
Official 2003 State Highway Map of Wyoming

External links

aaroads.com - Wyoming Routes 300-399
WYO 315 - WYO 314 to Bordeaux Road

Transportation in Platte County, Wyoming
315